Perforating folliculitis is a skin condition in humans characterized by discrete follicular keratotic eruptions involving mainly the hairy parts of the extremities.

See also
Cutaneous perforating disorders
List of cutaneous conditions

References

Conditions of the skin appendages